The men's high jump event at the 2007 Pan American Games was held on July 27.

Results

References
Official results

High
2007